The Episcopal Diocese of Western Michigan is the Episcopal diocese in the western half of the Lower Peninsula of Michigan.  The diocese was founded in 1874.

The diocese is headquartered in Grand Rapids, Michigan and covers a 33-county area that stretches from the Straits of Mackinac southward to the Indiana border and from Lake Michigan to approximately the middle of the state.   the website of the diocese describes it as having 15,000 communicants organized in 58 communities of faith, of which 54 are parishes and 4 are seasonal chapels.  It is organized into three regions, centered in Kalamazoo, Grand Rapids and Traverse City.

The Episcopal Diocese of Western Michigan is somewhat unusual in that it has no cathedral. From 1969 to 2007, the bishop and the diocesan offices were located at the Cathedral Church of Christ the King, a prominent edifice near Interstate 94. However, this building was sold in 2007, and the congregation of the Parish Church of Christ the King moved to Texas Corners where it remained until January 2012, when the congregation disbanded.

The first bishop of the diocese was George D. Gillespie. Robert R. Gepert, was elected on October 19, 2001, and was consecrated as the 8th diocesan bishop on April 27, 2002.  His episcopacy, which spanned 11 years, concluded with his retirement in 2013. Whayne M. Hougland, Jr., was elected as the 9th diocesan bishop in September 2013. Hougland was suspended in June 2019 after admitting to an extra-marital affair. Hougland resigned his position as bishop on July 1, 2021. The Rt. Rev. Skip Adams, a retired bishop of Central New York, served the Diocese in the capacity of assisting bishop on an interim basis. Bishop Prince Singh now presides as Bishop of the Dioceses of Western and Eastern Michigan.

Bishops
 George D. Gillespie (1875-1909)
 John N. McCormick (1909-1937)
 Lewis Bliss Whittemore (1937-1953)
 Dudley B. McNeil (1953-1959)
 Charles E. Bennison Sr. (1960-1984)
 Howard Meeks (1984-1988)
 Edward L. Lee (1989-2002)
 Robert R. Gepert (2002-2013)
 Whayne M. Hougland, Jr. (2013-2021)
 Prince G. Singh (2022 - Present)

References

External links
Official web site of the Diocese of Western Michigan
Journal of the Annual Convention, Diocese of Western Michigan

Western Michigan, Episcopal Diocese of
Diocese of Western Michigan
Religious organizations established in 1874
1874 establishments in Michigan
Province 5 of the Episcopal Church (United States)